The 2020–21 K Beerschot VA season was the club's eighth season in existence and its first season in the top flight of Belgian football. In addition to the domestic league, Beerschot participated in this season's edition of the Belgian Cup. The season covered the period from 3 August 2020 to 30 June 2021.

Players

First-team squad

Out on loan

Transfers

In

Out

Pre-season and friendlies

Competitions

Overview

Belgian First Division A

League table

Results summary

Results by round

Matches
The league fixtures were announced on 8 July 2020.

Belgian Cup

Statistics

Squad appearances and goals
Last updated 22 November 2020.

|-
! colspan=14 style=background:#dcdcdc; text-align:center|Goalkeepers

|-
! colspan=14 style=background:#dcdcdc; text-align:center|Defenders

|-
! colspan=14 style=background:#dcdcdc; text-align:center|Midfielders

|-
! colspan=14 style=background:#dcdcdc; text-align:center|Forwards

|-
! colspan=14 style=background:#dcdcdc; text-align:center|Players who have made an appearance this season but have left the club
|}

Goalscorers

References

External links

K Beerschot VA
Beerschot